"Boomerang" is a song by South Korean boy band Wanna One. The song serves as the lead single of their album, 0+1=1 (I Promise You).

Charts

Weekly chart

Awards and nominations

MBC Plus X Genie Music Awards

Mnet Asian Music Awards

Music program awards

Melon Popularity Award

See also 
 List of M Countdown Chart winners (2018)

References

External links 
 

Korean-language songs
2018 songs
Wanna One songs